The Couesnon is a river running from the département of Mayenne in north-western France, forming an estuary at Mont Saint-Michel. Its final stretch forms the border between the historical duchies of Normandy and Brittany. Its historically irregular course, alternating between two beds on the north and south of the Mont Saint-Michel but eventually definitely settling to the south bed, inspired the saying "The Couesnon in its madness placed the Mont in Normandy" ("le Couesnon en sa folie mit le Mont en Normandie"), as the Mont is just to the Norman side of the river's current mouth. However, the administrative boundary separating the two regions does not depend on the course of the river, and is about six kilometers west of the Mont.

Geography 

The Couesnon, the Sée and the Sélune form part of the complex water system of the bay of Mont Saint-Michel. On one side, the tide brings large quantities of sediment which cause large sandbars within the river. On the other, the three watercourses drive the sediment back out to sea.

In the 20th century, the Couesnon was turned into a canal, to reduce the erosion of its banks. In 1969, a dam was built. These modifications, and the causeway linking Mont Saint-Michel to the mainland, have caused the buildup of mudflats. To prevent the Mont becoming too connected to the mainland, plans are in place to replace the causeway with a bridge, and to modify the dam so that the sediment can once again be driven out to sea.

During spring tides, a tidal bore — a wave caused by the incoming tide — can be seen working its way up the river.

The Couesnon flows through the following departments and towns:
Ille-et-Vilaine: Fougères, Antrain
Manche: Pontorson

Hydrology and water quality
Water turbidity is moderate with a Secchi disc reading of 14 centimetres. Electrical conductivity at the mouth is high even at the verge of the tidal influence.

References

 Hogan, C Michael, Water quality of freshwater bodies in France, Lumina Tech. Press, Aberdeen (2006)

External links 

 The public works project

Rivers of France
Rivers of Mayenne
Rivers of Brittany
Rivers of Pays de la Loire
Rivers of Ille-et-Vilaine
0Couesnon